The 1985-86 French Rugby Union Championship was won by Toulouse that beat Agen  in the final.

Formula 

The 40 clubs were divided in 4 pools of ten.

The best two teams of each pool were admitted directly to the "last 16", while the teams classified from 3rd to 6th played a barrage

Qualification round 
The teams are listed as the ranking, in bold the teams admitted directly to "last 16" round.

Knockout stages

Barrage  
In bold the clubs qualified for the next round

"Last 16" 
In bold the clubs qualified for the next round

Quarter of finals 
In bold the clubs qualified for the next round

Semifinals

Final

External links
 Compte rendu finale 1986 lnr.fr

1986
France 1986
Championship